Tater may refer to:
 Potato
 Tater tot, a deep-fried grated potato side-dish similar to hash browns
 Taters, branding for deep-fried potato wedges served by the Mary Brown's restaurant chain in Canada
A home run in baseball jargon
Tater, a baseball bat manufacturer

See also

 
 
 Norwegian and Swedish Travellers, Romani people also known as tatere or tattare
 Tatar (disambiguation)